In differential geometry, the Lie derivative, named after Sophus Lie by Władysław Ślebodziński, evaluates the change of a tensor field (including scalar functions, vector fields and one-forms), along the flow defined by another vector field. This change is coordinate invariant and therefore the Lie derivative is defined on any  differentiable manifold.

Functions, tensor fields and forms can be differentiated with respect to a vector field. If T is a tensor field and X is a vector field, then the Lie derivative of T with respect to X is denoted . The differential operator  is a derivation of the algebra of tensor fields of the underlying manifold.

The Lie derivative commutes with contraction and the exterior derivative on differential forms.

Although there are many concepts of taking a derivative in differential geometry, they all agree when the expression being differentiated is a function or scalar field. Thus in this case the word "Lie" is dropped, and one simply speaks of the derivative of a function.

The space of vector fields forms a Lie algebra with respect to this Lie bracket. The Lie derivative constitutes an infinite-dimensional Lie algebra representation of this Lie algebra, due to the identity

valid for any vector fields X and Y and any tensor field T.

Considering vector fields as infinitesimal generators of flows (i.e. one-dimensional groups of diffeomorphisms) on M, the Lie derivative is the differential of the representation of the diffeomorphism group on tensor fields, analogous to Lie algebra representations as infinitesimal representations associated to group representation in Lie group theory.

Generalisations exist for spinor fields, fibre bundles with connection and vector-valued differential forms.

Motivation
A 'naïve' attempt to define the derivative of a tensor field with respect to a vector field would be to take the components of the tensor field and take the directional derivative of each component with respect to the vector field. However, this definition is undesirable because it is not invariant under changes of coordinate system, e.g. the naive derivative expressed in polar or spherical coordinates differs from the naive derivative of the components in Cartesian coordinates. On an abstract manifold such a definition is meaningless and ill defined. In differential geometry, there are  three main coordinate independent notions of differentiation of tensor fields: Lie derivatives, derivatives with respect to connections, and the exterior derivative of completely anti symmetric (covariant) tensors or differential forms. The main difference between the Lie derivative and a derivative with respect to a connection is that the latter derivative of a tensor field with respect to a tangent vector is well-defined even if it is not specified how to extend that tangent vector to a vector field. However a connection requires the choice of an additional geometric structure (e.g. a Riemannian metric or just an abstract connection) on the manifold. In contrast, when taking a Lie derivative, no additional structure on the manifold is needed, but it is impossible to talk about the Lie derivative of a tensor field with respect to a single tangent vector, since the value of the Lie derivative of a tensor field with respect to a vector field X at a point p depends on the value of X in a neighborhood of p, not just at p itself. Finally, the exterior derivative of differential forms does not require any additional choices, but is only a well defined derivative of differential forms (including functions).

Definition
The Lie derivative may be defined in several equivalent ways. To keep things simple, we begin by defining the Lie derivative acting on scalar functions and vector fields, before moving on to the definition for general tensors.

The (Lie) derivative of a function
Defining the derivative of a function  on a manifold is problematic because the difference quotient  cannot be determined while the displacement  is undefined.

The Lie derivative of a function  with respect to a vector field  at a point  is the function

of first-order autonomous (i.e. time-independent) differential equations in the tangent space , with 

For a coordinate chart  on the manifold  and  let  be the tangent linear map. The above system of differential equations is more explicitly written as a system

Setting  identifies the Lie derivative of a function with the directional derivative.

The Lie derivative of a vector field
If X and Y are both vector fields, then the Lie derivative of Y with respect to X is also known as the Lie bracket of X and Y, and is sometimes denoted . There are several approaches to defining the Lie bracket, all of which are equivalent. We list two definitions here, corresponding to the two definitions of a vector field given above:

The Lie derivative of a tensor field

Definition in terms of flows
The Lie derivative is the speed with which the tensor field changes under the space deformation caused by the flow.

Formally, given a differentiable (time-independent) vector field  on a smooth manifold  let
 be the corresponding local flow and  the identity map. Since  is a local diffeomorphism, for each  and  the inverse

of the differential  extends uniquely to the homomorphism 

between the tensor algebras of the tangent spaces  and  Likewise, the pullback map

lifts to a unique tensor algebra homomorphism

For every  there is, consequently, a tensor field  of the same valence as 's.

If  is an - or -type tensor field, then the Lie derivative  of  along a vector field  is defined at point  to be

The resulting tensor field  has the same valence as 's.

Algebraic definition
We now give an algebraic definition. The algebraic definition for the Lie derivative of a tensor field follows from the following four axioms:

Axiom 1. The Lie derivative of a function is equal to the directional derivative of the function. This fact is often expressed by the formula

Axiom 2. The Lie derivative obeys the following version of Leibniz's rule: For any tensor fields S and T, we have

Axiom 3. The Lie derivative obeys the Leibniz rule with respect to contraction:

Axiom 4. The Lie derivative commutes with exterior derivative on functions:

If these axioms hold, then applying the Lie derivative  to the relation  shows that

which is one of the standard definitions for the Lie bracket.

The Lie derivative acting on a differential form is the anticommutator of the interior product with the exterior derivative. So if α is a differential form,

This follows easily by checking that the expression commutes with exterior derivative, is a derivation (being an anticommutator of graded derivations) and does the right thing on functions.

Explicitly, let T be a tensor field of type . Consider T to be a differentiable multilinear map of smooth sections α1, α2, ..., αp of the cotangent bundle T∗M and of sections X1, X2, ..., Xq of the tangent bundle TM, written T(α1, α2, ..., X1, X2, ...) into R. Define the Lie derivative of T along Y by the formula

The analytic and algebraic definitions can be proven to be equivalent using the properties of the pushforward and the Leibniz rule for differentiation. The Lie derivative commutes with the contraction.

The Lie derivative of a differential form

A particularly important class of tensor fields is the class of differential forms. The restriction of the Lie derivative to the space of differential forms is closely related to the exterior derivative. Both the Lie derivative and the exterior derivative attempt to capture the idea of a derivative in different ways. These differences can be bridged by introducing the idea of an interior product, after which the relationships falls out as an identity known as Cartan's formula. Cartan's formula can also be used as a definition of the Lie derivative on the space of differential forms.

The interior product of X and ω is the k-form  defined as

The differential form  is also called the contraction of ω with X, and

is a  -antiderivation where  is the wedge product on differential forms. That is,  is R-linear, and

Also, for a function , that is, a real- or complex-valued function on M, one has

where  denotes the product of f and X.
The relationship between exterior derivatives and Lie derivatives can then be summarized as follows. First, since the Lie derivative of a function f with respect to a vector field X is the same as the directional derivative X(f), it is also the same as the contraction of the exterior derivative of f with X:

For a general differential form, the Lie derivative is likewise a contraction, taking into account the variation in X:

This identity is known variously as Cartan formula, Cartan homotopy formula or Cartan's magic formula. See interior product for details. The Cartan formula can be used as a definition of the Lie derivative of a differential form. Cartan's formula shows in particular that

The Lie derivative also satisfies the relation

Coordinate expressions

In local coordinate notation, for a type  tensor field , the Lie derivative along  is

here, the notation  means taking the partial derivative with respect to the coordinate .

The Lie derivative of a tensor is another tensor of the same type, i.e., even though the individual terms in the expression depend on the choice of coordinate system, the expression as a whole results in a tensor

The definition can be extended further to tensor densities.  If T is a tensor density of some real number valued weight w (e.g. the volume density of weight 1), then its Lie derivative is a tensor density of the same type and weight.

Notice the new term at the end of the expression.

For a linear connection , the Lie derivative along  is

Examples
For clarity we now show the following examples in local coordinate notation.

For a scalar field  we have:
.

Hence for the scalar field  and the vector field  the corresponding Lie derivative becomes 

For an example of higher rank differential form, consider the 2-form  and the vector field  from the previous example. Then,

Some more abstract examples.
.

Hence for a covector field, i.e., a differential form,  we have:

The coefficient of the last expression is the local coordinate expression of the Lie derivative. 

For a covariant rank 2 tensor field  we have:

If  is the symmetric metric tensor, it is parallel with respect to the Levi-Civita connection (aka covariant derivative), and it becomes fruitful to use the connection. This has the effect of replacing all derivatives with covariant derivatives, giving

Properties
The Lie derivative has a number of properties. Let  be the algebra of functions defined on the manifold M. Then

is a derivation on the algebra . That is,
 is R-linear and

Similarly, it is a derivation on  where  is the set of vector fields on M (cf. Theorem 6 from the article: Nichita, F.F. Unification Theories: New Results and Examples. Axioms 2019, 8, 60):

which may also be written in the equivalent notation

where the tensor product symbol  is used to emphasize the fact that the product of a function times a vector field is being taken over the entire manifold.

Additional properties are consistent with that of the Lie bracket. Thus, for example, considered as a derivation on a vector field,

one finds the above to be just the Jacobi identity. Thus, one has the important result that the space of vector fields over M, equipped with the Lie bracket, forms a Lie algebra.

The Lie derivative also has important properties when acting on differential forms. Let α and β be two differential forms on M, and let X and Y be two vector fields. Then
 
 
  where i denotes interior product defined above and it is clear whether [·,·] denotes the commutator or the Lie bracket of vector fields.

Generalizations
Various generalizations of the Lie derivative play an important role in differential geometry.

The Lie derivative of a spinor field
A definition for Lie derivatives of spinors along generic spacetime vector fields, not necessarily Killing ones, on a general (pseudo) Riemannian manifold was already proposed in 1971 by Yvette Kosmann. Later, it was provided a geometric framework which justifies her ad hoc prescription within the general framework of Lie derivatives on fiber bundles in the explicit context of gauge natural bundles which turn out to be the most appropriate arena for (gauge-covariant) field theories.

In a given spin manifold, that is in a Riemannian manifold  admitting a spin structure, the Lie derivative of a spinor field  can be defined by first defining it with respect to infinitesimal isometries (Killing vector fields) via the André Lichnerowicz's local expression given in 1963:

It is then possible to extend Lichnerowicz's definition to all vector fields (generic infinitesimal transformations) by retaining Lichnerowicz's local expression for a generic vector field , but explicitly taking the antisymmetric part of  only. More explicitly, Kosmann's local expression given in 1972 is:

It is worth noting that the spinor Lie derivative is independent of the metric, and hence also of the connection. This is not obvious from the right-hand side of Kosmann's local expression, as the right-hand side seems to depend on the metric through the spin connection (covariant derivative), the dualisation of vector fields (lowering of the indices) and the Clifford multiplication on the spinor bundle. Such is not the case: the quantities on the right-hand side of Kosmann's local expression combine so as to make all metric and connection dependent terms cancel.

To gain a better understanding of the long-debated concept of Lie derivative of spinor fields one may refer to the original article, where the definition of a Lie derivative of spinor fields is placed in the more general framework of the theory of Lie derivatives of sections of fiber bundles and the direct approach by Y. Kosmann to the spinor case is generalized to gauge natural bundles in the form of a new geometric concept called the Kosmann lift.

Covariant Lie derivative
If we have a principal bundle over the manifold M with G as the structure group, and we pick X to be a covariant vector field as section of the tangent space of the principal bundle (i.e. it has horizontal and vertical components), then the covariant Lie derivative is just the Lie derivative with respect to X over the principal bundle.

Now, if we're given a vector field Y over M (but not the principal bundle) but we also have a connection over the principal bundle, we can define a vector field X over the principal bundle such that its horizontal component matches Y and its vertical component agrees with the connection. This is the covariant Lie derivative.

See connection form for more details.

Nijenhuis–Lie derivative

Another generalization, due to Albert Nijenhuis, allows one to define the Lie derivative of a differential form along any section of the bundle Ωk(M, TM) of differential forms with values in the tangent bundle. If K ∈ Ωk(M, TM) and α is a differential p-form, then it is possible to define the interior product iKα of K and α. The Nijenhuis–Lie derivative is then the anticommutator of the interior product and the exterior derivative:

History
In 1931, Władysław Ślebodziński introduced a new differential operator, later called by David van Dantzig that of Lie derivation, which can be applied to scalars, vectors, tensors and affine connections and which proved to be a powerful instrument in the study of groups of automorphisms.

The Lie derivatives of general geometric objects (i.e., sections of natural fiber bundles) were studied by A. Nijenhuis, Y. Tashiro and K. Yano.

For a quite long time, physicists had been using Lie derivatives, without reference to the work of mathematicians. In 1940, Léon Rosenfeld—and before him (in 1921) Wolfgang Pauli—introduced what he called a ‘local variation’  of a geometric object  induced by an infinitesimal transformation of coordinates generated by a vector field .

See also
 Covariant derivative
 Connection (mathematics)
 Frölicher–Nijenhuis bracket
 Geodesic
 Killing field
 Derivative of the exponential map

Notes

References
  See section 2.2.
  See Chapter 0.
  See section 1.6.
  Extensive discussion of Lie brackets, and the general theory of Lie derivatives.
  For generalizations to infinite dimensions.
  For generalizations to infinite dimensions.
  Classical approach using coordinates.

External links
 

Differential geometry
Differential topology
Differential operators
Generalizations of the derivative